Olympos (Greek: Όλυμπος) is a former municipality in the Larissa regional unit, Thessaly, Greece. Since the 2011 local government reform it is part of the municipality Elassona, of which it is a municipal unit. Population 3,164 (2011). The municipal unit has an area of 303.964 km2. The seat of the municipality was in Kallithea.  The municipality was named after the nation's highest point, Mount Olympus.

Subdivisions
The municipal unit Olympos is subdivided into the following communities (constituent villages in brackets):
Flampouro (Skopia, Sparmos, Vrysopoules)
Kallithea Elassonos (Kallithea, Petroto)
Kokkinogeio
Kokkinopilos (Kokkinopilos, Kalyvia)
Lofos (Lofos, Asprochoma)
Olympiada
Pythio

Population

Geography

The municipality is mountainous, especially in the northeastern part, where Greece's tallest point, Mount Olympus, is situated. The village Kallithea is situated in the lower southwestern part, which is characterised by small rivers and farmlands. The Greek National Road 13 (Elassona - Katerini) passes through the municipal unit. Elassona lies south of Olympos, and the Pieria regional unit lies to the northeast.

External links
 Olympos on GTP Travel Pages
 Olympos municipal unit

References

Populated places in Larissa (regional unit)